Aline Wong (born Kan Lai Chung,  in 1941) is a Singaporean sociologist and former politician. She was one of the first women Parliament members in Singapore, elected in 1984. She went on to have a career in both politics and education. In 2001, she retired from politics, but continued to be active in the community and in education. In 2015, she became the first woman in Singapore to hold the position of chancellor, working at SIM University.

Biography 
Wong was born in Hong Kong in 1941.

Wong studied sociology and worked on issues involving the way Singapore's families were changing and how women were becoming involved in different areas of culture and the economy. Wong started her academic career as a lecturer at the University of Singapore (NUS) in 1971. Wong and Vivienne Wee started the first gender studies class in Singapore at NUS in 1987. Wong became a fellow at the Kennedy School of Government in 2002. Wong became an academic adviser for SIM University (UniSIM) starting in 2005. In 2015, she became the first woman named as chancellor of UniSIM and the first woman chancellor in education throughout all of Singapore.

In 1984, Wong, Dixie Tan and Yu-Foo Yee Shoon became the first women elected to Singapore's Parliament. Wong was a member of the People's Action Party (PAP) and represented Changkat. From 1988 to 2001, she represented Tampines GRC. In Parliament, she worked to advance issues that affected the lives of women and advocate for women's equality in public life. PAP's Women's Wing was run by Wong until 2001. Wong also become the Minister of State for Health in 1990 and five years later rose to the position of Senior Minister of State, where she focused on education. In 2001, she retired from working in politics. She worked on the Housing and Development Board (HDB) as chair between 2003 and 2007. Wong was also sent as the Women's Rights Representative from Singapore to the ASEAN Commission on the Promotion and Protection of the Rights of Women (ACWC) in Children in 2010.

Wong was inducted into the Singapore Women's Hall of Fame in 2014.

References

External links 
Speech by Aline Wong (2000)

1941 births
Hong Kong emigrants to Singapore
Singaporean people of Cantonese descent
Singaporean women scientists
People's Action Party politicians
Academic staff of the National University of Singapore
Living people
Singaporean women in politics
Members of the Parliament of Singapore